Alvin "Al" Goldfarb is an American academic administrator who served as the tenth president of Western Illinois University from 2002 to 2011. From 1977 to 2002, he was on the faculty of the department of theatre at Illinois State University in Normal, where he was also chairman of the theatre department, dean of fine arts from 1988 to 1998, and provost and vice president for academic affairs from 1998.

Education 
Goldfarb earned a Bachelor of Arts in Theatre Arts and Mass Communication from Queens College, City University of New York. He then earned a Master of Arts in Theatre and Cinema from Hunter College and a Ph.D. in theater history from the City College of New York.

Career 
In 2006, Goldfarb announced that he was being treated for prostate cancer and that a complete recovery was expected. At the July 2009 meeting of the WIU board of trustees, Goldfarb officially announced his intention to retire on June 30, 2011. It was announced that President Goldfarb would be succeeded as president of the university by Western's

provost and vice president for academic affairs, Jack Thomas, who succeeded him on July 1, 2011.

At Illinois State University, Goldfarb was involved in establishing an internship program with the Steppenwolf Theatre Company and constructing new center for the performing arts.

Goldfarb has researched and written extensively on the arts and on the Holocaust, of which his parents are survivors. He co-edited and contributed to the book Holocaust and Performance.

With Rebecca Rovit, he co-edited the book Theatrical performance during the Holocaust: texts, documents, memoirs (Baltimore : Johns Hopkins University Press, 1999. ).

Textbooks
He has written three widely used university textbooks on theater jointly with Edwin Wilson, a former Broadway theatre critic for The Wall Street Journal.
Living Theatre : A History,
2nd edition. New York : McGraw-Hill, c1994.  (alk. paper)
3rd edition 
Anthology of Living Theater,
1st edition, 	 Boston: McGraw-Hill, c1998. 
2nd edition. Boston: McGraw-Hill, c2001. 
3rd edition. 
Theater: the Lively Art
1st edition, 1991, 
4th edition, 2002, 
6th edition, forthcoming,

References

External links
Western Illinois University press release – "Dr. Alvin Goldfarb Named Western Illinois University President"
Western Illinois University – President Al Goldfarb

Graduate Center, CUNY alumni
Living people
Year of birth missing (living people)
Historians of theatre
Western Illinois University people
Illinois State University faculty